The Lepidoptera of Madeira consist of both the butterflies and moths recorded from the island of Madeira.

According to a recent estimate, there are 324 Lepidoptera species in Madeira.

Butterflies

Lycaenidae
Lampides boeticus (Linnaeus, 1767)
Lycaena phlaeas (Linnaeus, 1761)

Nymphalidae
Danaus plexippus (Linnaeus, 1758)
Hipparchia maderensis (Bethune-Baker, 1891)
Hypolimnas misippus (Linnaeus, 1764)
Issoria lathonia (Linnaeus, 1758)
Pararge aegeria (Linnaeus, 1758)
Pararge xiphia (Fabricius, 1775)
Vanessa atalanta (Linnaeus, 1758)
Vanessa cardui (Linnaeus, 1758)
Vanessa vulcania (Godart, 1819)

Pieridae
Colias croceus (Fourcroy, 1785)
Gonepteryx maderensis Felder, 1862
Pieris brassicae (Linnaeus, 1758)
Pieris rapae (Linnaeus, 1758)
Pieris wollastoni (Butler, 1886)

Moths

Autostichidae
Apatema fasciata (Stainton, 1859)
Dysallomima coarctella (Rebel, 1896)
Oecia oecophila (Staudinger, 1876)

Bedelliidae
Bedellia somnulentella (Zeller, 1847)

Blastobasidae
Blastobasis adustella Walsingham, 1894
Blastobasis bassii Sinev & Karsholt, 2004
Blastobasis decolorella (Wollaston, 1858)
Blastobasis desertarum (Wollaston, 1858)
Blastobasis divisus (Walsingham, 1894)
Blastobasis insularis (Wollaston, 1858)
Blastobasis lacticolella Rebel, 1940
Blastobasis laurisilvae Sinev & Karsholt, 2004
Blastobasis lavernella Walsingham, 1894
Blastobasis luteella Sinev & Karsholt, 2004
Blastobasis marmorosella (Wollaston, 1858)
Blastobasis maroccanella Amsel, 1952
Blastobasis nigromaculata (Wollaston, 1858)
Blastobasis ochreopalpella (Wollaston, 1858)
Blastobasis pica (Walsingham, 1894)
Blastobasis rebeli Sinev & Karsholt, 2004
Blastobasis salebrosella Rebel, 1940
Blastobasis serradaguae Sinev & Karsholt, 2004
Blastobasis spectabilella Rebel, 1940
Blastobasis splendens Sinev & Karsholt, 2004
Blastobasis subdivisus Sinev & Karsholt, 2004
Blastobasis virgatella Sinev & Karsholt, 2004
Blastobasis vittata (Wollaston, 1858)
Blastobasis walsinghami Sinev & Karsholt, 2004
Blastobasis wolffi Sinev & Karsholt, 2004
Blastobasis wollastoni Sinev & Karsholt, 2004

Carposinidae
Carposina anopta Diakonoff, 1990
Carposina atlanticella Rebel, 1894

Choreutidae
Anthophila fabriciana (Linnaeus, 1767)
Anthophila threnodes (Walsingham, 1910)
Choreutis nemorana (Hübner, 1799)
Tebenna micalis (Mann, 1857)

Coleophoridae
Coleophora coracipennella (Hübner, 1796)
Coleophora glaucicolella Wood, 1892
Coleophora versurella Zeller, 1849

Cosmopterigidae
Ascalenia echidnias (Meyrick, 1891)
Cosmopterix attenuatella (Walker, 1864)
Cosmopterix pulchrimella Chambers, 1875
Pyroderces argyrogrammos (Zeller, 1847)

Crambidae
Agriphila atlanticus (Wollaston, 1858)
Agriphila trabeatellus (Herrich-Schäffer, 1848)
Antigastra catalaunalis (Duponchel, 1833)
Aporodes floralis (Hübner, 1809)
Botyodes diniasalis (Walker, 1859)
Cynaeda dentalis (Denis & Schiffermuller, 1775)
Diaphania indica (Saunders, 1851)
Diasemiopsis ramburialis (Duponchel, 1834)
Duponchelia fovealis Zeller, 1847
Euchromius cambridgei (Zeller, 1867)
Euchromius ocellea (Haworth, 1811)
Eudonia angustea (Curtis, 1827)
Eudonia decorella (Stainton, 1859)
Eudonia scoriella (Wollaston, 1858)
Eudonia shafferi Nuss, Karsholt & Meyer, 1998
Eudonia stenota (Wollaston, 1858)
Evergestis isatidalis (Duponchel, 1833)
Hellula undalis (Fabricius, 1781)
Herpetogramma bipunctalis (Fabricius, 1794)
Herpetogramma licarsisalis (Walker, 1859)
Hodebertia testalis (Fabricius, 1794)
Mecyna asinalis (Hübner, 1819)
Mecyna atlanticum (Bethune-Baker, 1894)
Nomophila noctuella (Denis & Schiffermuller, 1775)
Palpita vitrealis (Rossi, 1794)
Pyrausta sanguinalis (Linnaeus, 1767)
Spoladea recurvalis (Fabricius, 1775)
Trichophysetis whitei Rebel, 1906
Udea ferrugalis (Hübner, 1796)
Udea maderensis (Bethune-Baker, 1894)
Udea numeralis (Hübner, 1796)
Uresiphita gilvata (Fabricius, 1794)

Elachistidae
Agonopterix heracliana (Linnaeus, 1758)
Agonopterix perezi Walsingham, 1908
Agonopterix scopariella (Heinemann, 1870)
Depressaria daucella (Denis & Schiffermuller, 1775)
Depressaria ultimella Stainton, 1849
Elachista encumeadae Kaila & Karsholt, 2002
Ethmia bipunctella (Fabricius, 1775)
Exaeretia conciliatella (Rebel, 1892)
Perittia carlinella (Walsingham, 1908)

Epermeniidae
Epermenia aequidentellus (E. Hofmann, 1867)

Erebidae
Autophila dilucida (Hübner, 1808)
Eublemma ostrina (Hübner, 1808)
Eublemma parva (Hübner, 1808)
Hypena lividalis (Hübner, 1796)
Hypena obsitalis (Hübner, 1813)
Ophiusa tirhaca (Cramer, 1773)
Schrankia costaestrigalis (Stephens, 1834)
Scoliopteryx libatrix (Linnaeus, 1758)
Tathorhynchus exsiccata (Lederer, 1855)
Utetheisa pulchella (Linnaeus, 1758)

Gelechiidae
Aproaerema anthyllidella (Hübner, 1813)
Bryotropha domestica (Haworth, 1828)
Bryotropha plebejella (Zeller, 1847)
Caryocolum marmorea (Haworth, 1828)
Caryocolum sciurella (Walsingham, 1908)
Chrysoesthia drurella (Fabricius, 1775)
Dichomeris acuminatus (Staudinger, 1876)
Ephysteris brachyptera Karsholt & Sattler, 1998
Ephysteris promptella (Staudinger, 1859)
Helcystogramma convolvuli (Walsingham, 1908)
Microlechia chretieni Turati, 1924
Ornativalva plutelliformis (Staudinger, 1859)
Phthorimaea operculella (Zeller, 1873)
Platyedra subcinerea (Haworth, 1828)
Scrobipalpa ergasima (Meyrick, 1916)
Scrobipalpa ocellatella (Boyd, 1858)
Scrobipalpa portosanctana (Stainton, 1859)
Scrobipalpa suaedicola (Mabille, 1906)
Scrobipalpa vasconiella (Rossler, 1877)
Sitotroga cerealella (Olivier, 1789)
Syncopacma polychromella (Rebel, 1902)
Thiotricha wollastoni (Walsingham, 1884)

Geometridae
Ascotis fortunata (Blachier, 1887)
Costaconvexa centrostrigaria (Wollaston, 1858)
Cyclophora maderensis (Bethune-Baker, 1891)
Cyclophora puppillaria (Hübner, 1799)
Eupithecia latipennata Prout, 1914
Eupithecia massiliata Milliere, 1865
Eupithecia rosai Pinker, 1962
Gymnoscelis rufifasciata (Haworth, 1809)
Herbulotina maderae Pinker, 1971
Idaea atlantica (Stainton, 1859)
Idaea maderae (Bethune-Baker, 1891)
Menophra maderae (Bethune-Baker, 1891)
Nycterosea obstipata (Fabricius, 1794)
Rhodometra sacraria (Linnaeus, 1767)
Scopula irrorata (Bethune-Baker, 1891)
Xanthorhoe rupicola (Wollaston, 1858)
Xenochlorodes magna Wolff, 1977
Xenochlorodes nubigena (Wollaston, 1858)

Glyphipterigidae
Acrolepiopsis infundibulosa Gaedike & Karsholt, 2001
Acrolepiopsis mauli Gaedike & Karsholt, 2001
Acrolepiopsis vesperella (Zeller, 1850)
Glyphipterix diaphora Walsingham, 1894
Glyphipterix pygmaeella Rebel, 1896

Gracillariidae
Caloptilia aurantiaca (Wollaston, 1858)
Caloptilia azaleella (Brants, 1913)
Caloptilia coruscans (Walsingham, 1907)
Caloptilia laurifoliae (M. Hering, 1927)
Caloptilia staintoni (Wollaston, 1858)
Dialectica hedemanni (Rebel, 1896)
Dialectica scalariella (Zeller, 1850)
Phyllocnistis canariensis M. Hering, 1927
Phyllocnistis citrella Stainton, 1856
Phyllonorycter chiclanella (Staudinger, 1859)
Phyllonorycter juncei (Walsingham, 1908)
Phyllonorycter mespilella (Hübner, 1805)
Phyllonorycter messaniella (Zeller, 1846)
Phyllonorycter myricae Deschka, 1976
Phyllonorycter platani (Staudinger, 1870)

Lyonetiidae
Leucoptera malifoliella (O. Costa, 1836)

Nepticulidae
Stigmella atricapitella (Haworth, 1828)
Stigmella aurella (Fabricius, 1775)
Stigmella centifoliella (Zeller, 1848)
Trifurcula ridiculosa (Walsingham, 1908)

Noctuidae
Acontia lucida (Hufnagel, 1766)
Agrotis atrux (Pinker, 1971)
Agrotis fortunata Draudt, 1938
Agrotis herzogi Rebel, 1911
Agrotis ipsilon (Hufnagel, 1766)
Agrotis rutae Rebel, 1939
Agrotis segetum (Denis & Schiffermuller, 1775)
Agrotis spinifera (Hübner, 1808)
Agrotis trux (Hübner, 1824)
Anarta trifolii (Hufnagel, 1766)
Autographa gamma (Linnaeus, 1758)
Callopistria latreillei (Duponchel, 1827)
Caradrina clavipalpis Scopoli, 1763
Chrysodeixis acuta (Walker, 1858)
Chrysodeixis chalcites (Esper, 1789)
Condica capensis (Walker, 1857)
Cornutiplusia circumflexa (Linnaeus, 1767)
Ctenoplusia limbirena (Guenee, 1852)
Cucullia calendulae Treitschke, 1835
Euplexia dubiosa (Bethune-Baker, 1891)
Euxoa canariensis Rebel, 1902
Galgula partita Guenee, 1852
Hadena atlantica (Hampson, 1905)
Hadena karsholti Hacker, 1995
Hecatera maderae Bethune-Baker, 1891
Helicoverpa armigera (Hübner, 1808)
Heliothis peltigera (Denis & Schiffermuller, 1775)
Leucania loreyi (Duponchel, 1827)
Luperina madeirae Fibiger, 2005
Mesapamea maderensis Pinker, 1971
Mniotype albostigmata (Bethune-Baker, 1891)
Mniotype inexpectata (Weidlich, 2001)
Mythimna serradagua Wolff, 1977
Mythimna vitellina (Hübner, 1808)
Mythimna unipuncta (Haworth, 1809)
Noctua pronuba (Linnaeus, 1758)
Noctua teixeirai Pinker, 1971
Nyctobrya maderensis Bethune-Baker, 1891
Ochropleura leucogaster (Freyer, 1831)
Peridroma saucia (Hübner, 1808)
Phlogophora meticulosa (Linnaeus, 1758)
Phlogophora wollastoni Bethune-Baker, 1891
Sesamia nonagrioides Lefebvre, 1827
Spodoptera cilium Guenee, 1852
Spodoptera exigua (Hübner, 1808)
Spodoptera littoralis (Boisduval, 1833)
Thysanoplusia orichalcea (Fabricius, 1775)
Trichoplusia ni (Hübner, 1803)
Xestia c-nigrum (Linnaeus, 1758)
Xylena exsoleta (Linnaeus, 1758)

Nolidae
Earias insulana (Boisduval, 1833)

Oecophoridae
Endrosis sarcitrella (Linnaeus, 1758)
Esperia sulphurella (Fabricius, 1775)
Hofmannophila pseudospretella (Stainton, 1849)

Plutellidae
Plutella xylostella (Linnaeus, 1758)

Praydidae
Prays citri (Milliere, 1873)
Prays friesei Klimesch, 1992

Psychidae
Apterona helicoidella (Vallot, 1827)
Luffia lapidella (Goeze, 1783)

Pterophoridae
Agdistis pseudocanariensis Arenberger, 1973
Agdistis tamaricis (Zeller, 1847)
Amblyptilia acanthadactyla (Hübner, 1813)
Crombrugghia laetus (Zeller, 1847)
Emmelina monodactyla (Linnaeus, 1758)
Gypsochares nielswolffi Gielis & Arenberger, 1992
Lantanophaga pusillidactylus (Walker, 1864)
Merrifieldia bystropogonis (Walsingham, 1908)
Stenoptilia bipunctidactyla (Scopoli, 1763)
Stenoptilodes taprobanes (Felder & Rogenhofer, 1875)

Pyralidae
Achroia grisella (Fabricius, 1794)
Aglossa caprealis (Hübner, 1809)
Ancylosis convexella (Lederer, 1855)
Ancylosis roscidella (Eversmann, 1844)
Cadra cautella (Walker, 1863)
Cadra figulilella (Gregson, 1871)
Cryptoblabes gnidiella (Milliere, 1867)
Ematheudes punctella (Treitschke, 1833)
Ephestia elutella (Hübner, 1796)
Ephestia kuehniella Zeller, 1879
Galleria mellonella (Linnaeus, 1758)
Nephopterix angustella (Hübner, 1796)
Neurotomia coenulentella (Zeller, 1846)
Pararotruda nesiotica (Rebel, 1911)
Pempelia lundbladi Rebel, 1939
Plodia interpunctella (Hübner, 1813)
Pyralis farinalis (Linnaeus, 1758)
Raphimetopus ablutella (Zeller, 1839)

Sesiidae
Synanthedon myopaeformis (Borkhausen, 1789)

Sphingidae
Acherontia atropos (Linnaeus, 1758)
Agrius convolvuli (Linnaeus, 1758)
Hippotion celerio (Linnaeus, 1758)
Hyles livornica (Esper, 1780)
Hyles tithymali (Boisduval, 1834)
Macroglossum stellatarum (Linnaeus, 1758)

Stathmopodidae
Neomariania rebeli (Walsingham, 1894)

Tineidae
Ceratobia oxymora (Meyrick, 1919)
Monopis barbarosi (Kocak, 1981)
Monopis crocicapitella (Clemens, 1859)
Monopis henderickxi Gaedike & Karsholt, 2001
Monopis nigricantella (Milliere, 1872)
Niditinea fuscella (Linnaeus, 1758)
Oinophila v-flava (Haworth, 1828)
Opogona omoscopa (Meyrick, 1893)
Opogona sacchari (Bojer, 1856)
Phereoeca allutella (Rebel, 1892)
Praeacedes atomosella (Walker, 1863)
Psychoides filicivora (Meyrick, 1937)
Stenoptinea cyaneimarmorella (Milliere, 1854)
Tenaga nigripunctella (Haworth, 1828)
Tinea dubiella Stainton, 1859
Tinea murariella Staudinger, 1859
Tinea trinotella Thunberg, 1794
Tineola bisselliella (Hummel, 1823)
Trichophaga robinsoni Gaedike & Karsholt, 2001
Trichophaga tapetzella (Linnaeus, 1758)

Tortricidae
Acleris variegana (Denis & Schiffermuller, 1775)
Acroclita anelpista Diakonoff & Wolff, 1976
Acroclita guanchana Walsingham, 1908
Acroclita subsequana (Herrich-Schäffer, 1851)
Aethes francillana (Fabricius, 1794)
Bactra lancealana (Hübner, 1799)
Bactra venosana (Zeller, 1847)
Bactra minima Meyrick, 1909
Cacoecimorpha pronubana (Hübner, 1799)
Clavigesta sylvestrana (Curtis, 1850)
Clepsis retiferana (Stainton, 1859)
Clepsis staintoni Obraztsov, 1955
Clepsis subcostana (Stainton, 1859)
Clepsis subjunctana (Wollaston, 1858)
Clepsis uncisecta Razowski & Wolff, 2000
Cochylimorpha decolorella (Zeller, 1839)
Crocidosema plebejana Zeller, 1847
Cydia archaeochrysa Diakonoff, 1986
Cydia pomonella (Linnaeus, 1758)
Cydia splendana (Hübner, 1799)
Epinotia thapsiana (Zeller, 1847)
Eucosma cana (Haworth, 1811)
Gypsonoma minutana (Hübner, 1799)
Lobesia neptunia (Walsingham, 1908)
Platynota rostrana (Walker, 1863)
Rhyacionia buoliana (Denis & Schiffermuller, 1775)
Selania leplastriana (Curtis, 1831)
Spilonota ocellana (Denis & Schiffermuller, 1775)
Thiodia glandulosana Walsingham, 1908

Yponomeutidae
Parahyponomeuta bakeri (Walsingham, 1894)
Zelleria oleastrella (Milliere, 1864)
Zelleria wolffi Klimesch, 1983

External links
Fauna Europaea

Lepidoptera

Lepidoptera
Madeira
Lists of invertebrates of Europe